Plexippus is a genus of jumping spiders that was first described by Carl Ludwig Koch in 1846. It is considered a senior synonym of Hissarinus and Apamamia.

Taxonomy
In Maddison's 2015 classification of the family Salticidae, Plexippus is placed in the tribe Plexippini, part of the Salticoida clade of the subfamily Salticinae.

Species
 it contains forty-five species and one subspecies, found in Oceania, Asia, Europe, Africa, Mexico, Paraguay, and on the Pacific Islands:
Plexippus andamanensis (Tikader, 1977) – India (Andaman Is.)
Plexippus aper Thorell, 1881 – New Guinea
Plexippus auberti Lessert, 1925 – Kenya, Tanzania
Plexippus baro Wesolowska & Tomasiewicz, 2008 – Ethiopia
Plexippus bhutani Zabka, 1990 – Bhutan, China
Plexippus brachypus Thorell, 1881 – Papua New Guinea (Yule Is.)
Plexippus calcutaensis (Tikader, 1974) – India, Philippines
Plexippus clemens (O. Pickard-Cambridge, 1872) – Algeria, Egypt, Turkey, Israel, Yemen, India, Iran?
Plexippus coccinatus Thorell, 1895 – Myanmar
Plexippus coccineus Simon, 1902 – Turkey ('Turcomania')
Plexippus devorans (O. Pickard-Cambridge, 1872) – Israel
Plexippus dushanbinus Andreeva, 1969 – Tajikistan
Plexippus fibulatus Dawidowicz & Wesolowska, 2016 – Kenya
Plexippus frendens Thorell, 1881 – New Guinea
Plexippus fuscus Rollard & Wesolowska, 2002 – Guinea
Plexippus gershomi Prószyński, 2017 – Israel
Plexippus incognitus Dönitz & Strand, 1906 – China, Korea, Taiwan, Japan
Plexippus insulanus Thorell, 1881 – Indonesia (Moluccas)
Plexippus iranus Logunov, 2009 – Iran
Plexippus kondarensis (Charitonov, 1951) – Kazakhstan, Tajikistan
Plexippus lutescens Wesolowska, 2011 – Namibia, Zimbabwe
Plexippus luteus Badcock, 1932 – Paraguay
Plexippus minor Wesolowska & van Harten, 2010 – United Arab Emirates
Plexippus niccensis Strand, 1906 – Japan
Plexippus ochropsis Thorell, 1881 – New Guinea
Plexippus paykulli (Audouin, 1826) (type) – Africa. Introduced to both Americas, Europe, Middle East, India, China, Japan, Korea, Philippines, Papua New Guinea, Australia, Pacific Is.
Plexippus p. nigrescens (Berland, 1933) – French Polynesia (Marquesas Is.)
Plexippus perfidus Thorell, 1895 – Myanmar
Plexippus petersi (Karsch, 1878) – Asia. Introduced to Africa and Pacific islands
Plexippus phyllus Karsch, 1878 – Australia (New South Wales)
Plexippus pokharae Zabka, 1990 – Nepal
Plexippus redimitus Simon, 1902 – India, Sri Lanka
Plexippus robustus (Bösenberg & Lenz, 1895) – Tanzania
Plexippus rubroclypeatus (Lessert, 1927) – Congo
Plexippus rubrogularis Simon, 1902 – South Africa
Plexippus seladonicus C. L. Koch, 1846 – Mexico
Plexippus setipes Karsch, 1879 – Turkmenistan, China, Korea, Thailand, Vietnam, Japan
Plexippus similis Wesolowska & van Harten, 1994 – Yemen
Plexippus strandi Spassky, 1939 – Tajikistan, Uzbekistan, Turkmenistan, Azerbaijan?, Greece?
Plexippus stridulator Pocock, 1899 – Papua New Guinea (New Britain)
Plexippus taeniatus C. L. Koch, 1846 – Mexico
Plexippus tectonicus Prószyński, 2003 – Israel, China
Plexippus tortilis Simon, 1902 – West Africa
Plexippus tsholotsho Wesolowska, 2011 – Zimbabwe, South Africa
Plexippus wesolowskae Biswas & Raychaudhuri, 1998 – Bangladesh
Plexippus zabkai Biswas, 1999 – Bangladesh

Gallery

References

External links

 Photograph of P. paykulli
 Photographs of Plexippus species
 Photograph of P. cf. paykulli
 Photograph of P. petersi

Salticidae genera
Cosmopolitan spiders
Salticidae
Taxa named by Carl Ludwig Koch